The 2002 Under-19 Cricket World Cup was played in New Zealand from 19 January to 9 February 2002. A total of 16 sides competed in the tournament with Australia defeating South Africa in the final. Zimbabwe's Tatenda Taibu was named Man of the Tournament.

Teams and qualification

The ten full members of the ICC qualified automatically:

 
 
 
 
 
 
 
 
 
 

  also received automatic qualification as they held ODI status at that time.

Another five teams qualified through regional qualification tournaments:

2001 ICC Africa Under-19 Championship
 (1st place)
2001 EAP Under-19 Cricket Trophy
 (1st place)
2001 ICC Americas Under-19 Championship
  (1st place)
2001 ICC Europe Under-19 Championship
  (1st place)
2001 Youth Asia Cup
  (1st place)

Group stage

Group A

Group B

Group C

Group D

Plate competition
The plate competition was contested by the eight teams that failed to qualify for the Super League.

Group 1

Group 2

Semi-finals

Final

Super League

Group 1

Group 2

Semi-finals

Final

Future senior players

Future players that featured for their national team in the tournament were:

References

External links
Tournament site on ESPN CricInfo

ICC Under-19 Cricket World Cup
2002 in cricket
2001–02 New Zealand cricket season
International cricket competitions in New Zealand
2002 ICC Under-19 Cricket World Cup